Bijeljina City Stadium is a multi-purpose stadium in Bijeljina, Republika Srpska, Bosnia and Herzegovina. It is currently used mostly for football matches and is the home ground of FK Radnik Bijeljina. The stadium has a capacity of 6,000 seats.

The record attendance on the stadium was on the concert of Željko Joksimović on 8 August 2013. Approximately 8,000 people were watching the concert that day.

Concerts and events
 Dragana Mirković – 15 July 2010
 Miroslav Ilić – 6 June 2013
 Željko Joksimović – 8 August 2013

References

External links
Gradski stadion Bijeljona at Bijeljina.org

Football venues in Bosnia and Herzegovina
Bijeljina
Buildings and structures in Republika Srpska